Marmentino is a town and comune in the province of Brescia, in Lombardy. Neighbouring communes are Bovegno, Collio, Irma, Lodrino, Pertica Alta, Pertica Bassa, Pezzaze and Tavernole sul Mella. It is located in the Trompia valley area.

References

Cities and towns in Lombardy